David Thirdkill (born April 12, 1960) is an American retired basketball player. He played in the NBA, and was the 1993 Israeli Basketball Premier League MVP.

NBA career
He was selected by the Phoenix Suns in the first round (15th overall) of the 1982 NBA draft. A  small forward from the College of Southern Idaho and Bradley University, Thirdkill played in five NBA seasons from 1982 to 1987.

Born in St. Louis, Missouri and nicknamed "The Sheriff", he played for the Suns, Detroit Pistons, Milwaukee Bucks, San Antonio Spurs and Boston Celtics. On January 24, 1986, he scored a career-high 20 points and grabbed a career-high 8 rebounds in a 135-114 win over the Golden State Warriors. He earned a championship ring with the 1985-86 Celtics.

In his NBA career, Thirdkill played in 179 games and scored a total of 510 points. Thirdkill made one 3 point shot as a rookie with Phoenix, then never made another three pointer. He finished his career one for 11 from three point land.

NBA career statistics

Regular season

|-
| align="left" | 1982–83
| align="left" | Phoenix
| 49 || 2 || 10.6 || .435 || .143 || .577 || 1.5 || 0.7 || 0.4 || 0.1 || 4.0
|-
| align="left" | 1983–84
| align="left" | Detroit
| 46 || 0 || 6.3 || .431 || .000 || .484 || 0.7 || 0.6 || 0.2 || 0.1 || 1.7
|-
| align="left" | 1984–85
| align="left" | Detroit
| 10 || 1 || 11.5 || .522 || .000 || .455 || 0.8 || 0.1 || 0.3 || 0.2 || 2.9
|-
| align="left" | 1984–85
| align="left" | Milwaukee
| 6 || 0 || 2.7 || .750 || .000 || .500 || 0.3 || 0.0 || 0.0 || 0.0 || 1.2
|-
| align="left" | 1984–85
| align="left" | San Antonio
| 2 || 2 || 26.0 || .455 || .000 || .833 || 3.5 || 1.5 || 1.0 || 0.5 || 7.5
|-
| style="text-align:left;background:#afe6ba;" | 1985–86†
| align="left" | Boston
| 49 || 0 || 7.9 || .491 || .000 || .625 || 1.4 || 0.3 || 0.2 || 0.1 || 3.3
|-
| align="left" | 1986–87
| align="left" | Boston
| 17 || 0 || 5.2 || .417 || .000 || .313 || 1.1 || 0.1 || 0.1 || 0.0 || 1.5
|- class="sortbottom"
| style="text-align:center;" colspan="2"| Career
| 179 || 5 || 8.2 || .457 || .091 || .565 || 1.2 || 0.5 || 0.3 || 0.1 || 2.8
|}

Playoffs

|-
| align="left" | 1984–85
| align="left" | San Antonio
| 5 || 0 || 4.4 || .250 || .000 || .500 || 0.4 || 0.4 || 0.0 || 0.0 || 0.8
|-
| style="text-align:left;background:#afe6ba;" | 1985–86†
| align="left" | Boston
| 13 || 0 || 3.6 || .333 || .000 || .455 || 0.6 || 0.2 || 0.2 || 0.0 || 1.3
|- class="sortbottom"
| style="text-align:center;" colspan="2"| Career
| 18 || 0 || 3.8 || .318 || .000 || .467 || 0.6 || 0.3 || 0.1 || 0.0 || 1.2
|}

International career 
In 1987, Thirdkill played in a tournament (Open Conference) for the Tanduay Rhum Masters team in the Philippine Basketball Association and won the championship aside from being named "Best Import" of the conference.  He returned for another conference in 1988, this time for the newly formed Purefoods team, which he led to another finals appearance. Thereafter, he played in Italy for Virtus Roma, in France for Chorale Roanne Basket and Saint-Quentin Basket-Ball.

He then played most notably in Israel for a spell of five years, mainly for Hapoel Tel Aviv, finally retiring in 1996. He was the 1993 Israeli Basketball Premier League MVP.

References

External links
Basketball-Reference.com: David Thirdkill
NBA page
Virtus Roma 88-89
David Thirdkill European stats in 1992-1996

1960 births
Living people
African-American basketball players
American expatriate basketball people in France
American expatriate basketball people in Israel
American expatriate basketball people in Italy
American expatriate basketball people in the Philippines
American men's basketball players
Basketball players from St. Louis
Bnei Hertzeliya basketball players
Boston Celtics players
Bradley Braves men's basketball players
Chorale Roanne Basket players
Continental Basketball Association coaches
Detroit Pistons players
Hapoel Tel Aviv B.C. players
Hapoel Holon players
Israeli Basketball Premier League players
Magnolia Hotshots players
Milwaukee Bucks players
Pallacanestro Virtus Roma players
Philippine Basketball Association imports
Phoenix Suns draft picks
Phoenix Suns players
Rochester Flyers players
San Antonio Spurs players
Small forwards
Southern Idaho Golden Eagles men's basketball players
Tanduay Rhum Masters players
21st-century African-American people
20th-century African-American sportspeople